Stygobromus montanus, commonly called Mountain cave amphipod, is a troglomorphic species of amphipod in family Crangonyctidae. It is endemic to Arkansas, in the United States.

References

Freshwater crustaceans of North America
Cave crustaceans
Crustaceans described in 1967
montanus
Endemic fauna of Arkansas